The following is a list of books, articles, and videos about the prime ministers of Canada.

Overview 
 
 

 

\
 Schlee, Gary.  (2018) Unknown and Unforgettable: A Guide to Canada's Prime Ministers. Toronto: Shorelawn Publishing.
 Dutil, Patrice (ed.) (2023)  Statesmen, Strategists and Diplomats. Canada's Prime Ministers and the Making of Foreign Policy. University of British Columbia Press. (forthcoming)

John A. Macdonald 
Dutil, Patrice. (2023) Sir John A. Macdonald.    Sutherland House. (forthcoming)
Laxer, James (2016) Staking Claims to a Continent: John A. Macdonald, Abraham Lincoln, Jefferson Davis, and the Making of North America. Anansi Press 
Patrice Dutil and Roger Hall (2014) John A. Macdonald at 200: New Reflections and Legacies. Dundurn Press 
Martin, Ged. (2013) John A. Macdonald: Canada's First Prime Minister. Dundurn Press 
Rohmer, Richard (2013) Sir John A.'s Crusade and Seward's Magnificent Folly Dundurn Press 
 Gwyn, Richard (2011) Nation Maker Sir John A. MacDonald: His Life, Our Times Vol. 2. Random House. 
 Gwyn, Richard (2008) John A: The Man Who Made Us Vol 1. Vintage Canada. 
 Johnson, J.K. and Waite, P.B. (2007) "Sir John Alexander Macdonald," in Canada's Prime Ministers, Macdonald to Trudeau: Portraits from the Dictionary of Canadian Biography. Toronto: University of Toronto Press. 
Patricia Phenix (2007) Private Demons: The Tragic Personal Life of John A. Macdonald McClelland & Stewart 
George R. Parkin (2007) Sir John A. MacDonald: The Makers of Canada (1908) Kessinger Publishing 
 Sletcher, Michael. (2004) "Sir John A. Macdonald," in James Eli Adams, and Tom and Sara Pendergast, eds., Encyclopedia of the Victorian Era. 4 vols., Danbury, CT: Grolier Academic Reference. 
Peter B Waite(2000) John a MacDonald: Revised Fitzhenry & Whiteside 
Estate of Donald Creighton (1998) John A. Macdonald: The Young Politician. The Old Chieftain University of Toronto Press 
 Swainson, Donald. (1989) Sir John A. Macdonald: The Man and the Politician. Kingston, ON: Quarry Press. 
Cynthia M. Smith, Jack McLeod (1989)Sir John A. : an anecdotal life of John A. Macdonald Oxford University Press 
 McSherry, James. (1984) The invisible lady: Sir John A. Macdonald's first wife. In Canadian Bulletin of Medical History, Vol. 1 pp. 91–97.
 Waite, P. B. (1976) + (1999) John A. Macdonald. Don Mills, ON: Fitzhenry and Whiteside Limited.
 Waite, P. B. (1975) Macdonald: His Life and World.  Toronto: McGraw-Hill Ryerson Limited. .
 Johnson, J.K. (1969) Affectionately Yours: The Letters of Sir John A. Macdonald and His Family. Toronto: Macmillan of Canada. 
Guillet, Edwin C, (1967) You'll Never Die, John A!. Toronto: Macmillan of Canada.
 Wallace, W. Stewart. (1924) Sir John Macdonald. Toronto: The Macmillan Company of Canada Limited.
 Pope, Joseph (1921) Correspondence of Sir John Macdonald: selections from the correspondence of Sir John Alexander Macdonald. Toronto: Oxford University Press.
 Pope, Joseph. (1915) The Day of Sir John Macdonald: A Chronicle of the First Prime Minister of the Dominion. Toronto: Brook & Co.
 Pope, Joseph. (1894) Memoirs of the Right Honourable Sir John Alexander Macdonald, G.C.B., First Prime Minister of The Dominion of Canada, Vols. 1&2. Ottawa: J. Durie & Son.
Collins, Joseph Edmund. (1883) Life and times of the Right Honourable Sir John A. Macdonald: Premier of the Dominion of Canada

Alexander Mackenzie 
William Buckingham, George W. Ross (2005) The Hon. Alexander MacKenzie: His Life and Times University Press of the Pacific: (Reprint of 1892 edition) 
W. H. Heick, "Mackenzie and Macdonald: federal politics and politicians in Canada, 1873–1878" (phd thesis, Duke Univ., Durham, N.C., 1966)
G. E. Briggs, "Edward Blake – Alexander Mackenzie: rivals for power?" (ma thesis, McMaster Univ., Hamilton, Ont., 1965).
G. F. Henderson, "Alexander Mackenzie and the Canadian Pacific Railway, 1871–1878" (ma thesis, Queen's Univ., Kingston, 1964)
Dale C. Thomson (1960) Alexander Mackenzie, Clear Grit Macmillan of Canada
T. A. Burke, "Mackenzie and his cabinet, 1873–1878," CHR, 41 (1960): 128–48.
William Buckingham, George William Ross "The Honourable Alexander Mackenzie: His Life and Times". 1892. Toronto: Rose Publishing Company Limited, 678 pages
Sir George W. Ross "Getting into Parliament and After", 1913. Toronto: William Briggs, 343 pages
T.G. Marquis "Builders of Canada from Cartier to Laurier", 1903. Toronto: John C. Winston and Co., 570 pages
John Charles Dent "The Canadian Portrait Gallery". Vol. 1 1880. Toronto John B. Magurn

John Abbott 
 Elisabeth L. Abbott, 1997, The Reluctant P.M.: Notes on the Life of Sir John Abbott, Canada's Third Prime Minister,  Sainte Anne de Bellevue, Québec, Abbott 
 Michael Hill, 2022. The Lost Prime Ministers. Toronto: Dundurn Press. Covers Abbott, Thompson, Bowell and Tupper.
 Pieter L. van Ewijk, 2020, "POWER BROKER; Canada's 3rd Prime Minister, John J.C. Abbott", Coaldale, Alberta: PvE Publishing

John Thompson 
 J. Castell Hopkins, 1895, Life and Work of the Rt. Hon. Sir John Thompson, Toronto: United Publishing Houses.
 J.P. Heisler, 1955, Sir John Thompson, thesis, University of Toronto.
 John Saywell (editor), 1960, The Canadian Journal of Lady Aberdeen, 1893–1898, Champlain Society.
 Bruce Hutchison, 1964, Mr. Prime Minister 1867–1964, Toronto: Longmans Canada.
 Lovell Clark, 1968, A History of the Conservative Administrations, 1891–1896, PhD thesis, University of Toronto.
 Peter Busby Waite, 1985, The Man from Halifax: Sir John Thompson, Prime Minister, Toronto: University of Toronto Press, .
 Michael Bliss, 1994, Right Honourable Men: The Descent of Canadian Politics from Macdonald to Mulroney, Toronto.
 J.L. Granatstein and Norman Hillmer, 1999, Prime Ministers: Ranking Canada's Leaders, Toronto: HarperCollinsPublishersLtd, A Phyllis Bruce Book, p. 40–42. .

Mackenzie Bowell 
 Betsy Boyce, 2001, The accidental Prime Minister: The biography of Sir Mackenzie Bowell, Ameliasburg, ON: Seventh Town Historical Society 
 Ted Glenn, 2022. A Very Canadian Coup. Toronto: Dundurn Press. 
 Barry K. Wilson, 2021. Sir Mackenzie Bowell: A Prime Minister Forgotten by History. Loose Cannon Press.

Charles Tupper 
Joseph Howe, Hon. Mr. Howe's Speech on Dr. Tupper's Railway Resolution. House of assembly. Monday, 9 April 1860.  (1860)
Joseph Howe, Speech of the Honorable Provincial Secretary, In reply to Doctor Tupper, On the Subject of Retrenchment. Wednesday, March 25  (1863)
Charles Tupper, A Letter to the Right Honourable the Earl of Carnarvon: In Reply to a Pamphlet Entitled "Confederation Considered in Relation to the Interests of the Empire"  (1866)
Charles Tupper, Letter from the Hon. Dr. Tupper, C.B., to the Hon. James McDonald, M.P.P.  (1872)
The Pacific Railway: Speeches Delivered by Hon. Sir Charles Tupper, K.C.M.G., Minister of Railways and Canals, Hon. H.L. Langevin, C.B., Minister of Public Works, J.B. Plumbs, Esq., M.P., (Niagara), Thomas White, Esq., M.P., (Cardwell), During the Debate in the House of Commons, Session 1880  (1880)
Charles Tupper, Le chemin de fer canadien du Pacifique: discours. Exposé complet de la question.  (1880)
Charles Tupper, Official Report of the Speech Delivered by Hon. Sir Charles Tupper, K.C.M.G., C.B., Minister of Raillways [sic] and Canals, On the Canadian Pacific Railway  (1882)
Charles Thibault, Biography of Sir Charles Tupper, Minister of Railway ... High Commissioner of Canada to England  (1883)
Charles Tupper, Unrestricted Reciprocity; Speech ... Delivered in the House of Commons, on Monday, March 19, 1888  (1888)
Charles Tupper, Preferential Trade Relations Between Great Britain and Her Colonies: An Address Delivered before the Montreal Board of Trade, January 20, 1896  (1896)
Charles Tupper, Speech on the Remedial Bill, Ottawa, 18 March 1896.  (1896)
Henry J. Morgan, Ad Multos Annos: A Tribute to Sir Charles Tupper on His Political Birthday, 1900  (1900)
E. M. Saunders, Three Premiers of Nova Scotia: The Hon. J. W. Johnstone, The Hon. Joseph Howe, The Hon. Charles Tupper   (1909)
Charles Tupper, Political Reminiscences of the Right Honourable Sir Charles Tupper, Bart., ed. W. A. Harkin (1914)
The Life and Letters of the Rt. Hon. Sir Charles Tupper, Bart., K.C.M.G., ed. E. M. Saunders, 2 vols.  (1916)
J. W. Longley, Sir Charles Tupper  (1916)
Supplement to the Life and Letters of the Rt. Hon. Sir Charles Tupper, Bart., G.C.M.G., ed. C. H. Tupper  (1926)
W. M. Whitelaw, The Maritimes and Canada Before Confederation  (1934)
H. G. Skilling, Canadian Representation Abroad: From Agency to Embassy  (1945)
A. W. MacIntosh, "The Career of Sir Charles Tupper in Canada, 1864–1900", Ph.D. thesis, University of Toronto  (1960)
G. R. Stevens, Canadian National Railways, 2 vols.  (1960–62)
D. H. Tait, "The Role of Charles Tupper in Nova Scotian Politics, 1855–1870", M.A. thesis, Dalhousie University  (1962)
J. M. Robinson, "A Canadian at the Court of Queen Victoria: The High Commissionership, 1880–1895", M.A. thesis, University of Calgary  (1967)
L. C. Clark, "A History of the Conservative Administrations, 1891 to 1896", Ph.D. thesis, University of Toronto  (1968)
Ian Wilson, "Fleming and Tupper: The Fall of the Siamese Twins, 1880", in Character and Circumstance: Essays in Honour of Donald Grant Creighton, ed. J. S. Moir  (1970)
P. B. Waite, The Life and Times of Confederation, 1864–1867: Politics, Newspapers, and the Union of British North America  (1971)
P. B. Waite, Canada, 1874–1896: Arduous Destiny  (1971)
D. A. Muise, "Elections and Constituencies: Federal Politics in Nova Scotia, 1867–1878", Ph.D. thesis, University of Western Ontario  (1971)
K. M. McLaughlin, "Race, Religion and Politics: The Election of 1896 in Canada", Ph.D. thesis, University of Toronto  (1974)
Robert Page, "Tupper's Last Hurrah: The Years as Opposition Leader, 1896–1900" in The West and the Nation: Essays in Honour of W. L. Morton, ed. Carl Berger and Ramsay Cook  (1976)
H. C. Cameron, "Nova Scotians in the Federal Cabinet, 1867–1878", M.A. thesis, Queen's University  (1976)
W. K. Lamb, History of the Canadian Pacific Railway  (1977)
K. G. Pryke, Nova Scotia and Confederation, 1864–74  (1979)
R. P. Langhout, "Developing Nova Scotia: Railways and Public Accounts, 1849–1867," Acadiensis 14.2  (1984–85)
Vincent Durant, War Horse of Cumberland: The Life and Times of Sir Charles Tupper  (1985)
Ben Forster, A Conjunction of Interests: Business, Politics, and Tariffs, 1825–1879  (1986)
R. P. Langhout, "Public Enterprise: An Analysis of Public Finance in the Maritime Colonies During the Period of Responsible Government", Ph.D. thesis, University of New Brunswick  (1989)
Ben Forster, "The 1870s: Political Integration" in The Atlantic Provinces in Confederation, ed. E. R. Forbes and D. A. Muise  (1993)
I. P. A. Buckner, "The 1860s: An End and a Beginning" in The Atlantic Region to Confederation, ed. P. A. Buckner and John Reid  (1994)
Jock Murray and Janet Murray, Sir Charles Tupper: Fighting Doctor to Father of Confederation  (1998)
J.L. Granatstein and Norman Hillmer, Prime Ministers: Ranking Canada's Leaders (1999)
Johanna Bertin, Sir Charles Tupper: The Bully for Any Great Cause  (2006)

Wilfrid Laurier 
 Patrice Dutil and David MacKenzie. Canada 1911: The Decisive Election that Shaped the Country (2011) 
 Grace Stewart, Heather. Sir Wilfrid Laurier: the weakling who stood his ground (2006) 
 Laurier LaPierre  Sir Wilfrid Laurier and the Romance of Canada – (1996). 
 Patrice Dutil. Devil's Adovcate: Godfroy Langlois and the Politics of Liberal Progressivism in Laurier's Quebec (1994) 
 Real Bélanger. Wilfrid Laurier; quand la politique devient passion (Québec et Montréal, 1986, rev.ed. 2007)
R. T. Clippingdale, Laurier, his life and world (Toronto, 1979)
H. B. Neatby. Laurier and a Liberal Quebec; a study in political management, ed. R. T. Clippingdale (Toronto, 1973)
 Joseph Schull. Laurier. The First Canadian (1965)
 Oscar Douglas Skelton, Life and Letters of Sir Wilfrid Laurier  2v (1921; reprinted 1965)
 H. Blair Neatby. Laurier and a Liberal Quebec: A Study in Political Management (1973)
 J. W. Dafoe, Laurier: A Study in Canadian Politics (1922)

Robert Borden 
Patrice Dutil and David MacKenzie Canada 1911: The Decisive Election that Shaped the Country (2011) 
Patrice Dutil and David MacKenzie Embattled Nation: Canada's Wartime Election of 1917 (2017) 
John English. Borden: his life and world (Toronto, 1977)
English, John. The decline of politics: the Conservatives and the party system, 1901–20 (Toronto, 1977)
 Brown, Robert Craig. Robert Laird Borden: A Biography (1975)
 Macquarrie, Heath. Robert Borden and the Election of 1911. Canadian Journal of Economics and Political Science, 1959, Vol. 25 Issue 3, pp 271–286 in JSTOR
 Cook, Tim. Warlords: Borden, Mackenzie King, and Canada's World Wars. Toronto: Allen Lane, 2012.

Arthur Meighen 
 
 Granatstein, J.L. and Hillmer, Norman. Prime Ministers: Ranking Canada's Leaders. HarperCollinsPublishersLtd., 1999. P. 75-82. .
 Meighen, Arthur. Unrevised and Unrepented II: Debating Speeches and Others by the Right Honourable Arthur Meighen (McGill-Queen's University Press, 2011), Edited by Arthur Milnes; this is an expanded version of Arthur Meighen, Unrevised and Unrepented: Debating Speeches and Others by the Right Honourable Arthur Meighen (1949)
 Oversea Addresses, June – July 1921  by Arthur Meighen at archive.org

William Lyon Mackenzie King 
Biographical
 Bliss, Michael. Right Honourable Men: The Descent of Canadian Politics from Macdonald to Mulroney (1994), pp. 123–184.
 Cook, Tim. Warlords: Borden, Mackenzie King, and Canada's World Wars. Toronto: Allen Lane, 2012.
 Courtney, John C. "Prime Ministerial Character: An Examination of Mackenzie King's Political Leadership," Canadian Journal of Political Science Vol. 9, No. 1 (Mar., 1976), pp. 77–100 in JSTOR.
 Dawson, R.M. William Lyon Mackenzie King: A Political Biography. Vol. 1: 1874–1923, (1958) online edition.
 English, John, and J.O. Stubbs, eds. Mackenzie King: Widening the Debate, (1977), 257pp; 11 essays by scholars.
 Esberey, Joy E. Knight of the Holy Spirit: A Study of William Lyon Mackenzie King. (1980). 245 pp. a psychobiography stressing his spirituality.
 Ferns, Henry, Bernard Ostry, and John Meisel. The Age of Mackenzie King (1976), 396pp; scholarly biography to 1919; excerpt and text search.
 Granatstein, J.L. "King, (William Lyon) Mackenzie (1874–1950)", Oxford Dictionary of National Biography, online ed, Jan 2011 accessed 12 Sept 2011
 Granatstein, J.L. Mackenzie King: His Life and World, (1977).
 Hutchison, Bruce. The Incredible Canadian. 1952, a controversial popular book.
Levine, Allan. King: William Lyon Mackenzie King: A Life Guided By the Hand of Destiny (2011), 515pp; .
 McGregor, F.A. The Fall & Rise of Mackenzie King, 1911–1919 (1962) online edition.
 
 Neatby, H. Blair. William Lyon Mackenzie King, 1924–1932: The Lonely Heights (1963) standard biography, online edition.
 Neatby, H. Blair. William Lyon Mackenzie King: 1932–1939: the Prism of Unity (1976) standard biography online edition.
  Stacey, C.P. A Very Double Life: The Private World of Mackenzie King (1985) excerpt and text search.  
 Thompson, Neville. The Third Man: Churchill, Roosevelt, Mackenzie King and the Friendships that won WWII. Toronto: Sutherland House, 2021.
 Wardhaugh, Robert A. "A Marriage of Convenience? Mackenzie King and Prince Albert Constituency," Prairie Forum 1996 21(2): 177–199. He represented the safe Saskatchewan district 1926–45; his goal was to disarm the Progressives.
 Whitaker, Reginald. "Political Thought and Political Action in Mackenzie King." Journal of Canadian Studies 1978–1979 13(4): 40–60. .

Scholarly studies
 Allen, Ralph. Ordeal by Fire: Canada, 1910–1945, (1961), 492pp online edition.
 Betcherman, Lita-Rose. Ernest Lapointe: Mackenzie King's Great Quebec Lieutenant. (2002). 435 pp.
  Cuff, R.D. and Granatstein, J.L. Canadian-American Relations in Wartime: From the Great War to the Cold War. (1975). 205 pp.
 Donaghy, Greg, ed. Canada and the Early Cold War, 1943–1957 (1998) online edition.
 Dummitt, Christopher. Unbuttoned: A History of Mackenzie King's Secret Life. McGill-Queen's University Press, 2017.
 Dziuban, Stanley W. Military Relations between the United States and Canada, 1939–1945 (1959) online edition.
 Eayrs James. In Defence of Canada. 5 vols. 1964–1983. the standard history of defense policy.
 Esberey, J.B. "Personality and Politics: A New Look at the King-Byng Dispute," Canadian Journal of Political Science vol 6 no. 1 (March 1973), 37–55.
 Granatstein, J. L. Canada's War: The politics of the Mackenzie King government, 1939–1945 (1975)
 Granatstein, J.L. Conscription in the Second World War, 1939–1945;: A study in political management (1969).
 Granatstein, J.L. and Norman Hillmer. Prime Ministers: Ranking Canada's Leaders, 1999, pp. 83–101.
 Macfarlane, John. "Double Vision: Ernest Lapointe, Mackenzie King and the Quebec Voice in Canadian Foreign Policy, 1935–1939," Journal of Canadian Studies 1999 34(1): 93–111; argues Lapointe guided the more imperialist Mackenzie King through three explosive situations: the Ethiopian crisis of 1935, the Munich crisis of 1938, and the formulation of Ottawa's 'no-neutrality-no-conscription' pact in 1939.
 Mackenzie, David. King and Chaos. (1935 election) University of British Columbia Press, 2023. (forthcoming)
 MacLaren, Roy. Mackenzie King in the age of the Dictators. McGill-Queen's University Press, 2019.
 Neatby, H. Blair. The Politics of Chaos: Canada in the Thirties (1972) online edition.
 Stacey, C. P. Arms, Men and Governments: The War Policies of Canada, 1939–1945 (1970).
 Stacey, C. P. Canada and the Age of Conflict: Volume 2: 1921–1948; the Mackenzie King Era, University of Toronto Press 1981, .
 Teigrob, Robert. Five Days in Hitler's Germany: Mackenzie King's Mission to Avert a Second World War, Toronto: University of Toronto Press, 2019.
 Thompson, John H., and Allan Seager. Canada 1922–1939. (1985). standard scholarly survey. (Part of The Canadian Centenary Series.)
 Whitaker, Reginald. The Government Party: Organizing and Financing the Liberal Party of Canada, 1930–1958 (1977).

Primary sources
 The Canadian Annual Review of Public Affairs (annual, 1901–1938), full text for 1920 online and downloadable.
 Mackenzie King, W. L. Industry and Humanity: A Study in the Principles Under-Lying Industrial Reconstruction (1918) online edition; also  full text online and downloadable.
 The diaries of William Lyon Mackenzie King, 50,000 pages, typescript; fully searchable.
 Pickersgill, J.W., and Donald F. Forster, The Mackenzie King Record. 4 vols. Vol. 1: 1939–1944 and Vol. 2: 1944–1945 (University of Toronto Press, 1960); and Vol. 3: 1945–1946 online and Vol. 4: 1946–1947 online (University of Toronto Press, 1970). Edited from King's private diary.
 Hou, Charles, and Cynthia Hou, eds. Great Canadian Political Cartoons, 1915 to 1945. (2002). 244pp.
 Canadian Department of External Affairs, Documents on Canadian External Relations (Ottawa: Queen's Printer, 1967–). These cover the period 1909–1960. (Often referred to as DCER.)
Television series
 Brittain, Donald. The King Chronicles, National Film Board, 1988.

R.B. Bennett 
Monographs
Andrew D. Maclean; R. B. Bennett, Prime Minister of Canada, Toronto, Excelsior Publishing Co., 1935.
Ernest Watkins; R. B. Bennett: A Biography, 1963.
J. R. H. Wilbur; The Bennett New Deal: Fraud or Portent, 1968.

Peter Busby Waite; Loner: Three Sketches of the Personal Life and Ideas of R.B. Bennett, 1870–1947, 1992.
Christopher McCreery and Arthur Milnes (editors): The Authentic Voice of Canada, Kingston, Ontario, McGill – Queen's University Press, Centre for the Study of Democracy, 2009, . This book is a collection of Bennett's speeches in the British House of Lords from 1941–47.
Peter Busby Waite; In Search of R.B. Bennett, McGill-Queen's University Press, 2012.
John Boyko; Bennett: The Rebel Who Challenged And Changed A Nation, Toronto, Key Porter Books, 2010, .
Other works
Bruce Hutchison; The Incredible Canadian, Toronto 1952, Longmans Canada. This book is mainly concerned with William Lyon Mackenzie King, but also includes substantial material on R. B. Bennett.
Lord Beaverbrook; Friends, 1959.
H. Blair Neatby; The Politics of Chaos: Canada in the Thirties, 1972 ch 4 on Bennett, pp 51–72 online version.
C. P. Stacey; Canada and the Age of Conflict, volume 2, 1981.

Louis St. Laurent 
Patrice Dutil (ed.); The Unexpected Louis St-Laurent: Politics and Policies for a Modern Canada, University of British Columbia Press, 2020 .
J. W. Pickersgill, My years with Louis St-Laurent: a political memoir (Toronto and Buffalo, N.Y., 1975)
D. C. Thomson, Louis St. Laurent: Canadian (Toronto, 1967)

John Diefenbaker 
Bibliography
 
 
 Courtney, John C. (2022)  Revival and Change: The 1957 and 1958 Diefenbaker Elections. University of British Columbia Press. 
 
 
 
 
 
 
 
 
 
 
 Spencer, Dick. (1994) Trumpets and Drums: John Diefenbaker on the Campaign Trail. Greystone Books. 
 
 
 
 

Online sources

  (fee for article)

Lester B. Pearson 
 Anderson, Antony. The Diplomat: Lester Pearson and the Suez Crisis.  Toronto: Goose Lane, 2015.

 Also .
 Also .

Writings

 Also published by Pall Mall Press (1970), .

Pierre Trudeau 
 Aivalis, Christo. The Constant Liberal: Pierre Trudeau, Organized Labour and the Canadian Social Democratic Left. Vancouver: University of British Columbia Press, 2018.
 Bergeron, Gérard. Notre miroir à deux faces: Trudeau-Lévesque. Montreal: Québec/Amérique, c1985. 
 Bliss, Michael. Right Honourable Men: the descent of Canadian politics from Macdonald to Mulroney, 1994.
 Bothwell, Robert and Granatstein, J.L. Pirouette : Pierre Trudeau and Canadian foreign policy, 1990. 
 Bowering, George. Egotists and Autocrats: the Prime Ministers of Canada, 1999.
 Burelle, André.  Pierre Elliott Trudeau: l'intellectuel et le politique, Montréal: Fides, 2005, 480 pages. 
 Butler, Rick, Jean-Guy Carrier, eds. The Trudeau decade. Toronto: Doubleday Canada, 1979.
 Butson, Thomas G. Pierre Elliott Trudeau. New York: Chelsea House, c1986. 
 Clarkson, Stephen; McCall, Christina. Trudeau and our times. Toronto: McClelland & Stewart, c1990–c1994. 2 v.  
 Cohen, Andrew, J. L. Granatstein, eds. Trudeau's Shadow: the life and legacy of Pierre Elliott Trudeau. Toronto: Vintage Canada, 1999.
 Couture, Claude. Paddling with the Current: Pierre Elliott Trudeau, Étienne Parent, liberalism and nationalism in Canada. Edmonton: University of Alberta Press, c1998. Issued also in French: La loyauté d'un laïc.  
 Donaldson, Gordon (journalist). The Prime Ministers of Canada, 1997.
 English, John. Citizen of the World: The Life of Pierre Elliott Trudeau Volume One: 1919–1968 (2006);  Just Watch Me: The Life of Pierre Elliott Trudeau Volume Two: 1968–2000 (2009); Knopf Canada,  
 Griffiths, Linda. Maggie & Pierre: a fantasy of love, politics and the media: a play. Vancouver: Talonbooks, 1980. 
 Gwyn, Richard. The Northern Magus: Pierre Trudeau and Canadians. Toronto: McClelland & Stewart, c1980. 
 Hillmer, Norman and Granatstein, J.L. Prime Ministers: Rating Canada's Leaders, 1999. .
 Laforest, Guy. Trudeau and the end of a Canadian dream. Montreal: McGill-Queen's University Press, c1995.  
 Litt, Paul. Trudeaumania. Vancouver: UBC Press, 2016.
 Lotz, Jim. Prime Ministers of Canada, 1987.
 McDonald, Kenneth. His pride, our fall: recovering from the Trudeau revolution. Toronto: Key Porter Books, c1995. 
 McIlroy, Thad, ed.  A Rose is a rose: a tribute to Pierre Elliott Trudeau in cartoons and quotas. Toronto: Doubleday, 1984.  
 Mills, Allen. Citizen Trudeau: An Intellectual Biography, 1944-1965. Toronto: Oxford University Press, 2016.
 Nemni, Max and Nemni, Monique. Young Trudeau: Son of Quebec, Father of Canada, 1919–1944. Toronto: Douglas Gibson Books, 2006.  (Based on private papers and diaries of Pierre Trudeau which he gave the authors in 1995)
 Nemni, Max and Nemni, Monique. Trudeau Transformed: The Shaping of a Statesman, 1944-1965. Toronto: McClelland and Stewart, 2011.
 Peterson, Roy. Drawn & quartered: the Trudeau years. Toronto: Key Porter Books, 1984.
 Plamondon, Bob. The Truth About Trudeau. Ottawa: Great River Media, 2013. 
 Radwanski, George. Trudeau. New York: Taplinger Pub. Co., 1978. 
 Raymaker, Darryl. Trudeau's Tango: Alberta Meets Pierre Elliott Trudeau, 1968-1972. Edmonton: University of Alberta Press, 2017.
 Ricci, Nino. Extraordinary Canadians Pierre Elliott Trudeau (2009)
 Sawatsky, John. The Insiders: Government, Business, and the Lobbyists, 1987.
 Simpson, Jeffrey. Discipline of power: the Conservative interlude and the Liberal restoration. Toronto: Macmillan of Canada, 1984. 
 Stewart, Walter. Shrug: Trudeau in power. Toronto: New Press, 1971. 
 Southam, Nancy. Pierre, McClelland & Stewart, September 19, 2006, 408 pages 
 Simard, François-Xavier. Le vrai visage de Pierre Elliott Trudeau, Montréal: Les Intouchables, April 19, 2006 
 Vastel, Michel.  The outsider: the life of Pierre Elliott Trudeau. Toronto: Macmillan of Canada, c1990. 266 pages. Translation of: Trudeau, le Québécois. 
 Walters, Eric. Voyageur, Toronto: Penguin Groups 2008
 Wright, Robert. Three Nights in Havana: Pierre Trudeau, Fidel Castro and the Cold War World. Toronto: HarperCollins, 2007.
 Wright, Robert. Trudeaumania: The Rise to Power of Pierre Elliott Trudeau. Toronto; Harper Collins, 2016.
 Zink, Lubor J. Trudeaucracy. Toronto: Toronto Sun Publishing Ltd., 1972. 150 pages. OCLC 837009381.

Archival videos of Trudeau
 
 

Videos about Trudeau
 Pierre Elliott Trudeau Memoirs. 292 minutes. By Terence McKenna and Brian McKenna. CBC, 1994.

Works by Trudeau
 Memoirs. Toronto: McClelland & Stewart, c1993. 
 Towards a just society: the Trudeau years, with Thomas S. Axworthy, (eds.) Markham, Ont.: Viking, 1990.
 The Canadian Way: Shaping Canada's Foreign Policy 1968–1984, with Ivan Head
 Two innocents in Red China. (Deux innocents en Chine rouge), with Jacques Hébert 1960.
  Against the Current: Selected Writings, 1939–1996. (À contre-courant: textes choisis, 1939–1996). Gerard Pelletier (ed)
 The Essential Trudeau. Ron Graham, (ed.) Toronto: McClelland & Stewart, c1998. 
 The asbestos strike. (Grève de l'amiante), translated by James Boake 1974
 Pierre Trudeau Speaks Out on Meech Lake. Donald J. Johnston, (ed). Toronto: General Paperbacks, 1990. 
 Approaches to politics. Introd. by Ramsay Cook. Prefatory note by Jacques Hébert. Translated by I. M. Owen. from the French Cheminements de la politique. Toronto: Oxford University Press, 1970. 
 Underwater Man, with Joe MacInnis.  New York:  Dodd, Mead & Company, 1975.  
 Federalism and the French Canadians. Introd. by John T. Saywell. 1968
 Conversation with Canadians. Foreword by Ivan L. Head. Toronto, Buffalo: University of Toronto Press 1972. 
 The best of Trudeau. Toronto: Modern Canadian Library. 1972 
 Lifting the shadow of war. C. David Crenna, editor. Edmonton: Hurtig, c1987. 
 Human rights, federalism and minorities. (Les droits de l'homme, le fédéralisme et les minorités), with Allan Gotlieb and the Canadian Institute of International Affairs

Joe Clark 
 
 
 
 
 
 
 The Insiders: Government, Business, and the Lobbyists, by John Sawatsky, 1987.
 Prime Ministers of Canada, by Jim Lotz, 1987.
 Mulroney: The Politics of Ambition, by John Sawatsky, Toronto 1991, MacFarlane, Walter, and Ross publishers.
 Memoirs, by Pierre Elliott Trudeau, Toronto 1993, McClelland & Stewart publishers, .
 A Nation Too Good to Lose: Renewing the Purpose of Canada, by Joseph Clark, Toronto 1994, Key Porter Books, .
 Right Honourable Men: the descent of Canadian politics from Macdonald to Mulroney, by Michael Bliss, 1994.
 The Prime Ministers of Canada, by Gordon Donaldson (journalist), 1997.
 Prime Ministers: Rating Canada's Leaders, by Norman Hillmer and J.L. Granatstein, 1999. .
 Egotists and Autocrats: The Prime Ministers of Canada, by George Bowering, 1999.
 Bastards and Boneheads: Canada's Glorious Leaders, Past and Present, by Will Ferguson, 1999.
 In My Own Name, by Maureen McTeer, 2003.
 The Secret Mulroney Tapes, edited by Peter C. Newman, 2006.
 Memoirs 1939–1993, by Brian Mulroney, 2007.

John Turner 

 
 
 
 Mulroney: The Politics of Ambition, by John Sawatsky, Toronto 1991, McFarlane, Walter, and Ross publishers, .
 Granatstein, J.L. and Norman Hillmer. Prime Ministers: Ranking Canada's Leaders, (Toronto: 1999, HarperCollins) .
 Turner, John. Politics With Purpose, 40th anniversary edition, McGill-Queen's University Press, 2008.
 Paikin, Steve. John Turner. Toronto: Sutherland House, 2022.

Brian Mulroney 
 Blake, Raymond B. ed. Transforming the Nation: Canada and Brian Mulroney (McGill-Queen's University Press), 2007. 456pp; 
 Winners, Losers, by Patrick Brown (journalist), Rae Murphy, and Robert Chodos, 1976.
 Where I Stand, by Brian Mulroney, 1983.
 Brian Mulroney: The Boy from Baie Comeau, by Nick Auf der Maur, Rae Murphy, and Robert Chodos, 1984.
 Mulroney: The Making of the Prime Minister, by L. Ian MacDonald, 1984.
 The Insiders: Government, Business, and the Lobbyists, by John Sawatsky, 1987.
 Prime Ministers of Canada, by Jim Lotz, 1987.
 Selling Out: Four Years of the Mulroney Government, by Eric Hamovitch, Rae Murphy, and Robert Chodos, 1988.
 Friends in high places: politics and patronage in the Mulroney government, by Claire Hoy, 1989.
 Mulroney: The Politics of Ambition, by John Sawatsky, 1991.
 Right Honourable Men: the Descent of Canadian Politics from Macdonald to Mulroney, by Michael Bliss, 1994.
 On the Take: Crime, Corruption and Greed in the Mulroney Years, by Stevie Cameron, 1994.
 The Prime Ministers of Canada, by Gordon Donaldson (journalist), 1997.
 Presumed Guilty: Brian Mulroney, the Airbus Affair, and the Government of Canada, by William Kaplan, 1998.
 Prime Ministers: Rating Canada's Leaders, by Norman Hillmer and J.L. Granatstein, 1999. .
 The Last Amigo: Karlheinz Schreiber and the Anatomy of a Scandal, by Stevie Cameron and Harvey Cashore, 2001.
 A Secret Trial: Brian Mulroney, Stevie Cameron, and the Public Trust, by William Kaplan, 2004.
 The Secret Mulroney Tapes: Unguarded Confessions of a Prime Minister, by Peter C. Newman, 2005.
 Memoirs: 1939-1993 by Brian Mulroney, 2007.
 Master of Persuasion: Brian Mulroney's Global Legacy, by Fen Osler Hampson, 2018.

Kim Campbell 
Campbell, Kim. (1996). Time and Chance: The Political Memoirs of Canada's First Woman Prime Minister. Doubleday Canada, 434 pages.

Jean Chrétien 

Chrétien, Jean (2018). My Stories, My Times. Random House Canada, 288 pages. 
Chrétien, Jean (2018). Mes Histoires. LaPresse, 288 pages. 
Chrétien, Jean (2021). My Stories, My Times, v. 2. Random House Canada.

Double Vision: The Inside Story of the Liberals in Power, by Edward Greenspon and Anthony Wilson-Smith, Toronto 1996, Doubleday Canada publishers, .
One-Eyed Kings, by Ron Graham, Toronto 1986, Collins Publishers, .
The Shawinigan Fox: How Jean Chrétien Defied the Elites and Reshaped Canada, by Bob Plamondon, Ottawa 2017, Great River Media, .

Academic
 Flanagan, Tom. (2022). Pivot or Pirouette? The 1993 Canadian General Election. Vancouver: University of British Columbia Press.

Paul Martin 
 ; Autobiography
 Gray, John (2003). Paul Martin: The Power of Ambition. Key Porter Books. .
 Wells, Paul. (2007) Right Side Up: The Fall of Paul Martin and the Rise of Stephen Harper's New Conservatism (Douglas Gibson Books) 344 pp 
 Wilson-Smith, Anthony; Greenspon, Edward (1996). Double Vision: The Inside Story of the Liberals in Power. Doubleday Canada. .

Stephen Harper 
  Behiels, Michael D. "Stephen Harper's Rise to Power" (PDF) American Review of Canadian Studies Spring 2010, Vol. 40 Issue 1, pp 118–45
 Chantal, Hébert. (2007) French Kiss: Stephen Harper's Blind Date with Quebec  Vintage Canada, 
 
 Flanagan, Tom. (2009) Harper's Team: Behind the Scenes in the Conservative Rise to Power (2nd ed), 
 
 Gutstein, Donald. Harperism: How Stephen Harper and his Think Tank Colleagues Have Transformed Canada. Toronto: Lorimer, 2014.
 Harris, Michael. (2014) Party of One: Stephen Harper And Canada's Radical Makeover, 554 pp. Viking; Second Impression edition. 
 Ibbitson, John. (2015) Stephen Harper, 448 pp. Signal. .
 Johnson, William. (2006) Stephen Harper & the Future of Canada (2nd ed) Douglas Gibson, 
Mackey, Lloyd. (2005) "The pilgrimage of Stephen Harper" ECW Press 
 Martin, Lawrence. "Harperland: The Politics of Control" Viking Canada (2010). 
 Plamondon, Bob. Full Circle: Death and Resurrection in Canadian Conservative Politics (2006), 472 pp., 
 Wells, Paul.  (2007) Right Side Up: The Fall of Paul Martin and the Rise of Stephen Harper's New Conservatism Douglas Gibson Books, 344 Pages  
 

Works by Harper
Right Here, Right Now: Politics and Leadership in the Age of Disruption. 2018.  
A Great Game: The Forgotten Leafs & the Rise of Professional Hockey. 2013.

Justin Trudeau 
 Trudeau, Justin. (2014) Common Ground. HarperCollins Publishers, 352 Pages. 
Ivison, John. (2019) Trudeau: The Education of a Prime Minister. Signal, 368 Pages. 
Lukacs, Martin. (2019) The Trudeau Formula: Seduction and Betrayal in an Age of Discontent. Black Rose Books, 295 Pages. 
Raj, Althia. (2013) Contender: The Justin Trudeau Story. Huffington Post Canada (eBook). Archive
Wherry, Aaron. (2019) Promise and Peril: Justin Trudeau in Power. HarperCollins Publishers, 368 Pages.

Videos about Trudeau 

 God Save Justin Trudeau (2014). Dir. Guylaine Maroist, Eric Ruel. Documentary about the boxing match between Trudeau and Conservative Senator Patrick Brazeau.

See also 

Bibliography of Canada
Bibliography of Canadian history
Bibliography of Canadian military history
Bibliography of Nova Scotia
Bibliography of Saskatchewan history
Bibliography of Alberta history
Bibliography of British Columbia
Bibliography of the 1837–38 insurrections in Lower Canada
List of books about the War of 1812

References

External links 
Prime Minister's Official Site
The Prime Ministers of Canada – The Historica Dominion Institute (Simon Fraser University & Rogers Communications)
Prime Ministers of Canada – Library of Parliament
Prime Ministers – Canada History

Prime ministers
Lists of prime ministers of Canada
Prime ministers of Canada
C